Jeffrey is a play by Paul Rudnick. At first no theater would produce the play, because it was described as a comedy about AIDS. But after an acclaimed, sold-out run at the tiny WPA Theater in New York City, the show transferred for a commercial run. The play ran from December 31, 1992 to February 14, 1993 at the WPA Theatre.

Productions
The original production opened in January 1993, at the WPA Theatre, directed by Christopher Ashley, set and projection design James Youmans, lighting design Donald Holder, costume design David C. Woolard, sound design Donna Riley, and wig and hair design David H. Lawrence. The cast starred John Michael Higgins (Jeffrey), Patrick Kerr (Man #1 in Bed/Gym Rat/Skip Winkly/Casting Director/Headdress Waiter/Man #2), Darryl Theirse (Man #2 in Bed/Gym Rat/Salesman/Boss/Man #1/Chaps man/Thug #1/Young Priest/Sean), Richard Poe (Man #3 in Bed/Gym Rat/Don/Tim/Dad/Mr. Dan/Chuck Farling), Bryan Batt (Darius/Man #4 in Bed), Edward Hibbert (Sterling/Man #5 in Bed), Tom Hewitt (Steve/Man #6 in Bed), and Harriet Sansom Harris (Woman in Bed/Showgirl/Ann Marwood Bartle/Debra Moorhouse/Sharon/Mom/Mrs. Marcangelo). Notable replacements included Jeff Hayenga (Jeffrey), Peter Bartlett (Sterling), Anthony M. Brown (Steve), Demitri Corbin (Sean), Anne Lange (Sharon), Keith Langsdale (Don), Greg Louganis (Darius), Albert Macklin (Dave), Theresa McElwee (Sharon), and Scott Whitehurst (Sean).

It was later adapted into a film in 1995, written by Rudnick and directed by Ashley, with only Batt reprising his role.

Reviews
Frank Rich of the New York Times said the show was "the funniest play of this season and maybe last season, too."

Awards and nominations

References

External links
 

1990s LGBT literature
1993 plays
American plays adapted into films
HIV/AIDS in theatre
LGBT-related plays
Off-Broadway plays
Plays about actors
Plays set in New York City